Get to the River Before it Runs Too Low EP is an Extended Play by Sea Wolf, released on May 8, 2007.

Track listing
All songs by Alex Brown Church.

 "You're a Wolf" - 3:35
 "The Garden You Planted" - 4:01
 "I Made A Resolution" - 3:52
 "Sea Monuments" - 4:25
 "I Don't Know If I'll Be Back This Time" - 2:26

Personnel
Brian Canning (electric guitar)
Aniela Perry (cello)
Alex Brown Church (vocals, acoustic guitar, bass guitar)
Elliot Chenault (electric guitar)
Jennifer Furches (violin, background vocals)
Tanya Haden (cello)
Aaron Burrows (keyboards)
Scott McPherson (drums, percussion)

References

External links
 Sea Wolf - Get To The River Before It Runs Too Low EP at Dangerbird Records
 Sea Wolf - Get To The River Before It Runs Too Low at AllMusic

2007 EPs
Dangerbird Records EPs
Sea Wolf (band) EPs